Spikings is a surname. Notable people with the surname include: 

Barry Spikings (born 1939), British film producer
Rebecca Spikings-Goldsman (1967–2010), American film producer and filmmaker